Albert Leon Bedner (July 9, 1898 – July 12, 1988) was an American football player who played three seasons in the National Football League with the Frankford Yellow Jackets and New York Giants. He played college football at Lafayette College and attended Wilkes-Barre High School in Wilkes-Barre, Pennsylvania.

References

External links
Just Sports Stats

1898 births
1988 deaths
Players of American football from Pennsylvania
American football guards
American football tackles
Lafayette Leopards football players
Frankford Yellow Jackets players
New York Giants players
Sportspeople from Wilkes-Barre, Pennsylvania